Mountain Cabin Recreation Site is a recreation site, and former settlement, near the north-eastern ridge of the Pasquia Hills in Canadian province of Saskatchewan.

The recreation area has free camping, fire pits, a shelter, and bathrooms, and is one of the closest free camping areas to Wildcat Hill Provincial Park.

It is located at the junction of Saskatchewan Highways 9 and 55, approximately 88 km north of Hudson Bay, 76 km south of The Pas, and 42 km east of Pakwaw Lake.

The Pasquia Hills are sometimes known as the Pasquia Mountains, or The Pas Mountains, which is where the word Mountain comes from in the name. The original cabin belonged to a mining prospector, and was embedded into the side of a hill.

Another potential origin of the name comes from the Forest Ranger cabin in the area. From 1906 to 1930, the Dominion Forest Service built over a dozen ranger cabins in the Pasquia National Forest Reserve, including one at the mouth of Mountain Creek, which originates in the Pasquia Hills and empties into the Nitenai River. The cabin was officially called Mountain Creek Cabin, but was often shortened to Mountain Cabin, even in official correspondence. The Mountain Creek Cabin was destroyed by a fire in 1961.

See also 
 List of communities in Saskatchewan
 List of protected areas of Saskatchewan

References 

Hudson Bay No. 394, Saskatchewan
Former villages in Saskatchewan